The Archaeological Review from Cambridge (ARC) is a biannual academic journal of archaeology. It is managed and published on a non-profit, voluntary basis by postgraduate researchers in the Department of Archaeology at the University of Cambridge. Each issue addresses a particular subject of interest within archaeology, featuring topics such as ethnoarchaeology, feminist archaeology and landscape archaeology.

The first issue of ARC was published in 1981. Following a brief hiatus, the journal returned to regular production in the spring of 1983, and has since been continually published twice a year. The journal's current general editor is Sergio Russo.

Aims and Intentions 
ARC aims to provide a platform for the discussion of current archaeological research, welcoming relevant contributions from archaeologists of any temporal, geographic or theoretical standpoint. A statement of editorial intent was outlined in Volume 2.1 (Spring 1983), expressing that ARC was established in order to bridge the gap between the formal publication of major research projects in leading journals, and the more informal discussions which take place at seminars and conferences.

Issues typically consist of a thematic section (containing articles relating to the issue's overarching theme), a general section (intended to provide a forum within which subjects, not connected with the thematic section but of current interest, may be presented) and commentary (covering shorter notes and contributions, reviews and correspondence arising from the study and practice of archaeology more widely). Book and article reviews are also a regular feature of each journal.

Table of Issues

Notable Contributors 

A number of notable archaeologists have contributed to the journal since its founding, including: Graeme Barker, Dilip Kumar Chakrabarti, Christopher Chippindale, Ian Hodder, Lynn Meskell, Colin Renfrew, Chris Scarre, Charles Thurstan Shaw, Laurajane Smith, Peter Stone, Christopher Tilley, and John Bennet, amongst others.

References

External links 
 
 YouTube Channel

Publications established in 1981
Archaeology journals
English-language journals
Biannual journals
Cambridge University academic journals
Academic journals edited by students
1981 establishments in England